In music, a repeat sign is a sign that indicates a section should be repeated. If the piece has one repeat sign alone, then that means to repeat from the beginning, and then continue on (or stop, if the sign appears at the end of the piece). A corresponding sign facing the other way indicates where the repeat is to begin. These are similar to the instructions da capo and dal segno.

Different endings
When a repeat calls for a different ending, numbered brackets above the bars indicate which to play the first time (1.), which to play the second time (2.), and so on if necessary. These are called "first-time bars" and "second-time bars", or "first and second endings". They are also known as "volta brackets" and although there are normally 2 volta brackets, there is no limit to how many there can be.

In Unicode
In Unicode, repeat signs are part of the Musical Symbols and they are coded as follows:

Other notation
When only standard  keyboard characters are available, the punctuation marks vertical bar and colon are used to represent repeat signs: |: ... :|

In Gregorian chant, a repeat is indicated by a Roman numeral following a section. This is common particularly in a Kyrie, where the lines followed by "iii" or "iij" are to be sung three times (corresponding to the correct liturgical form).

In shape-note singing, repeat signs usually have four dots, between each line of the staff. The corresponding sign to show where the repeat is from is either the same sign reversed (if it is at the beginning of a bar), or the dots themselves (if it is in the middle of a bar). First and second endings are given with just the numbers above the corresponding bars. Repeats notated at the beginning of a verse, or given with multiple lines of text per verse, are generally required; the repeats given for most songs of the final few lines are always optional, and almost always used only for the final verse sung.

See also
Abbreviation (music)
Coda
Da capo
Dal segno
Repetition (music)

References

External links
List of repeat variations

Musical notation